Thlaspi caerulescens, the Alpine Penny-cress or alpine pennygrass, is a flowering plant in the family Brassicaceae. It is found in Scandinavia and Europe.

Description
Thlaspi caerulescens is a low biennial or perennial plant that has small basal rosettes of stalked elliptic–lanceolate leaves with entire margins. The one or more flowering stems have small stalkless, alternate leaves clasping the stem. The inflorescence is a dense raceme which continues to lengthen after flowering. Each has four sepals, four petals, six stamens (four long and two short) with violet anthers, and a single carpel. The fruit is many-seeded and narrowly spatulate and has a notched tip. This plant flowers in late spring.

Distribution and habitat
In Europe it is found in Finland and Sweden, in all but the most northerly regions. It is also found in the Alps, the Massif Central, the Pyrenees, eastern Norway, southern Germany, and northern England. It is a plant of dry hillside meadows, forest margins, banks, gardens, lawns, pastures, field margins, yards and bare places.

Phytoremediation
Alpine pennycress has been cited in phytoremediation to have special phytoextractional properties and is known to absorb cadmium with very good results and in certain instances is said to have absorbed zinc as well.  Leaves accumulate up to 380 mg/kg Cd.

References

Brassicaceae
Flora of Finland
Flora of Norway
Flora of Sweden
Flora of Europe
Flora of Germany
Alpine flora
Phytoremediation plants